Valmet L-80 TP Turbo-Vinha was a prototype for a new Finnish turboprop basic trainer aircraft. The aircraft, which carried the designation OH-VBB, first flew on 12 February 1985.  It was destroyed in a crash on 24 April 1985, during its 14th flight, killing the test pilot Paavo Janhunen. The aircraft was a further development of the Valmet L-70 Vinka and would eventually lead to the Valmet L-90 Redigo.

The Allison turboprop engine was used in the second aircraft, the L-80 TP Turbo-Vinha (OH-VTM) which was destroyed during an aerial display in Belgium.  The third  of the series (OH-VTP) got the new name Redigo or RediGo (used in sales brochures).

Specifications (L-80 TP)

See also

References

Further reading
 Green, William and Gordon Swanborough. "Valmet's Turbotrainer...A Northern Newcomer with Tradition". Air International. March 1986, Vol 30 No 3. pp. 111–117. .

1980s Finnish military trainer aircraft
Low-wing aircraft
Valmet aircraft
Single-engined turboprop aircraft
Single-engined tractor aircraft